Bhakti Fest is a yoga, dance, and sacred music festival that has been held annually in Joshua Tree, California since 2009. Bhakti Fest is a certified non profit 501c3 and has its roots in yoga, sacred music (kirtan), and meditation. It embraces ancient and modern sacred wisdom and traditional and non-traditional spiritual practices.

References

External links 

 

Music festivals in California